Cuneipectus is a genus of beetles in the family Carabidae, containing the following species:

 Cuneipectus foveatus Sloane, 1915
 Cuneipectus frenchi Sloane, 1907

References

Licininae